The Eternal flame is a memorial to the military and civilian victims of the Second World War in Sarajevo, Bosnia and Herzegovina. The memorial was dedicated on 6 April 1946, the first anniversary of the liberation of Sarajevo from the four-year-long occupation by Nazi Germany and the fascist Independent State of Croatia.

The memorial was designed by architect Juraj Neidhardt and is located in the former Landesbank building at the center of Sarajevo at the junction of Mula Mustafa Bašeskije, Titova and Ferhadija streets.

Inscription

Gallery

References

Bosnia and Herzegovina in World War II
Monuments and memorials in Bosnia and Herzegovina
Grad Sarajevo
Eternal flames
1946 establishments in Bosnia and Herzegovina
Yugoslav World War II monuments and memorials
National Monuments of Bosnia and Herzegovina